The Lage vuurtoren van IJmuiden ("low lighthouse of IJmuiden") is a round, cast-iron lighthouse in IJmuiden, Netherlands, designed by Quirinus Harder. It was built in 1878 by D.A. Schretlen & Co, a company in Leiden and activated the following year. In 1909, the top three sections were moved to Vlieland where they serve as a separate lighthouse. In 1966 the lighthouse was moved slightly.

Together with the Hoge vuurtoren van IJmuiden, the 24-metre high lighthouse forms a pair of leading lights marking the IJgeul (the entrance on the North Sea to the North Sea Canal). The lighthouse now has five storeys and 88 steps; it is unmanned and not open for visitors. Since 1981 it is a Rijksmonument.

See also

 List of lighthouses in the Netherlands
 Cast-iron architecture

Notes

External links

 Lage vuurtoren van IJmuiden on www.vuurtorens.net

Lighthouses completed in 1878
IJmuiden
Rijksmonuments in North Holland
Velsen